The Forks is an unincorporated community located in Estill County, Kentucky, United States.

References

Unincorporated communities in Estill County, Kentucky
Unincorporated communities in Kentucky